Goiești is a commune in Dolj County, Oltenia, Romania. It is composed of thirteen villages: Adâncata, Fântâni, Goiești, Gruița, Mălăești, Mogoșești, Muereni, Piorești, Pometești, Popeasa, Țandăra, Vladimir and Zlătari.

References

Communes in Dolj County
Localities in Oltenia